In Norse mythology, Gulltoppr (Old Norse: , "golden mane") is one of the horses of the gods. Gulltoppr is mentioned in a list of horses in the Poetic Edda poem Grímnismál and in Nafnaþulur section of the Prose Edda. According to Prose Edda book Gylfaginning, he is the horse of Heimdallr. Rudolf Simek theorizes that Snorri assigned a horse to Heimdall in an attempt to systematize the mythology.

In popular culture
In the 2022 video game God of War Ragnarök, Gulltoppr serves as the personal steed of Heimdall, although he isn't represented as a horse, but rather as a lion-like creature with horns native to Asgard known as a 'Gradungr'. When Kratos must fight Heimdall, Gulltoppr serves as the first phase of the boss fight.

See also
 List of fictional horses

Notes

References

 Simek, Rudolf (2007) translated by Angela Hall. Dictionary of Northern Mythology. D.S. Brewer. 

Horses in Norse mythology